Michele Beretta (born 22 October 1994 in Milan) is a racing driver from Italy. He currently competes in the European Le Mans Series.

Career
In 2023, Beretta returned to the GT World Challenge Europe Endurance Cup, taking part in the Gold Cup class in an Iron Lynx Lamborghini alongside Rolf Ineichen and Leonardo Pulcini.

Racing Record

Career Summary

† As Beretta was a guest driver, he was ineligible to score points.

Complete Formula Abarth Championship results 
(key) (Races in bold indicate pole position) (Races in italics indicate fastest lap)

*Ineligible for points.

Complete FIA Formula 3 European Championship results
(key) (Races in bold indicate pole position) (Races in italics indicate fastest lap)

Complete GP3 Series results
(key) (Races in bold indicate pole position) (Races in italics indicate fastest lap)

Complete 24 Hours of Le Mans results

Complete European Le Mans Series results 
(key) (Races in bold indicate pole position) (Races in italics indicate fastest lap)

References

External links

 Profile at Driver Database
 Official website

1994 births
Living people
FIA Formula 3 European Championship drivers
Italian GP3 Series drivers
Blancpain Endurance Series drivers
ADAC GT Masters drivers
European Le Mans Series drivers
Racing drivers from Milan
24 Hours of Le Mans drivers
GT World Challenge America drivers
Formula Abarth drivers
Euroformula Open Championship drivers
British GT Championship drivers
WeatherTech SportsCar Championship drivers
International GT Open drivers
Cram Competition drivers
Euronova Racing drivers
EuroInternational drivers
BVM Racing drivers
Mücke Motorsport drivers
Trident Racing drivers
Ombra Racing drivers
Team Rosberg drivers
Mercedes-AMG Motorsport drivers
Phoenix Racing drivers
Fortec Motorsport drivers
Nürburgring 24 Hours drivers
Lamborghini Squadra Corse drivers
Iron Lynx drivers